Exos Aerospace Systems & Technologies is an aerospace manufacturer and developer of reusable launch systems intended to support uncrewed orbital spaceflight launches, and is based in Caddo Mills, Texas.

Foundation
Exos Aerospace is based on both technologies and people from Armadillo Aerospace, a company founded by video game developer John Carmack. Armadillo had competed for the Ansari X Prize for commercial human suborbital spaceflight in the early 2000s and later developed a series of suborbital vehicles. In August 2013, Carmack placed Armadillo in "hibernation" following the crash of their STIG-B rocket and began "actively looking for outside investors to restart work on the company’s rockets".

Exos Aerospace was founded in May 2014; former employees of Armadillo Aerospace were a significant part of the founding team. Exos was created to carry on the reusable commercial spacecraft started by Armadillo Aerospace. Exos even set up their operations in one of Armadillo's former facilities at the Caddo Mills Municipal Airport, in Texas. In 2015, the assets of Armadillo Aerospace were formally sold to Exos Aerospace.

Overview
Exos Aerospace is focused on suborbital research rockets with an intent of initially launching micro satellites and eventually progressing to autonomous spaceflight. Exos Aerospace is developing the SARGE family for its suborbital vehicles. All research and development is based at the new manufacturing facility in Greenville, Texas. This is inclusive of rocket design, fabrication, assembly, storage and testing. Engines up to 5,000-lbf nominal thrust can be tested on a static test skid at the hangar complex. The company is a NASA REDDI provider and is targeting to qualify to be a NASA IDIQ provider under the Flight Opportunities program. Due to its re-usability, Exos intends to leverage the reusability of the SARGE rocket in development of its orbital technology program that will be manufacturing their orbital vehicle in a new state of the art facility in the Basilicata region of Italy.

SARGE
The SARGE (aka SARGE M1), an acronym of Suborbital Autonomous Rocket with GuidancE, is a suborbital rocket based on the STIG-B rocket platform developed as part of Armadillo Aerospace's lunar lander program. The SARGE vehicle employs a LOX-ethanol propulsion module based on the LE23000FC series engines, producing approximately 5500 lbs of thrust. Pressurized helium  cold gas thrusters provide attitude control for pitch-roll-yaw and pointing capability. Exos plans to use this technology as the design basis for a reusable (first stage) launch vehicle capable of carrying  to low Earth orbit.

The SARGE suborbital sounding rocket is designed to be reusable. As of 27 October 2019, no SARGE rocket had reached its intended suborbital altitude. However, the same rocket was launched four times between 2018 and 2019, demonstrating its reusability.

EXOS Aerospace operates from Spaceport America in New Mexico. On 14 February 2018, the Federal Aviation Administration issued Exos Aerospace a Reusable Vehicle Mission Launch License.

Launches
First
On 25 August 2018, Exos flew an unsuccessful Pathfinder Mission proving SARGE as a reusable launch vehicle. Due to a malfunction of an onboard GPS receiver, the flight was terminated with an engine shutdown prematurely. The rocket reached an altitude of 28 km (planned altitude was 80 km).

Second
The second launch of SARGE took place on 2 March 2019. Due to winds, the flight reached an altitude of 20 km (planned altitude was 80 km). It carried several small research payloads.

Third
On 29 June 2019, at 18:00, UTC Exos Aerospace conducted a SARGE launch at the Spaceport America in New Mexico. The flight failed seconds after launch due to loss of control. The rocket was however recovered intact. This was the third SARGE flight, with previous flights in August 2018 and March 2019. The previous flights also suffered failures that prevented the rocket from reaching the planned altitude.

The third flight was carrying educational, research and technology demonstration payloads for nine customers. Among them were a biomedical experiment from the Mayo Clinic and a dust aggregation experiment from University of Central Florida. The status of payloads is unknown, but they were probably recovered intact.

Fourth
The fourth flight on 26 October 2019, 17:42 UTC, ended in failure. The flight suffered multiple failures: first, the rocket lost control of attitude seconds after launch. Second, the rocket appears to have disintegrated to some degree as several pieces of debris fell back to the ground. Third, the launch vehicle separated from the drogue. Rather than land softly as it had on previous flights, it returned uncontrolled and at high speed. The rocket body crashed near the launch pad nearly three and a half minutes after liftoff. Live footage seems to indicate the nose cone was properly returning under a parachute canopy. The flight carried several small research payloads.

Exos Aerospace determined that the fourth flight experienced a structural failure. They plan to build a second SARGE rocket to continue flying. (They have built only one; the same rocket was used on all four launches in 2018-2019.)

References

Aerospace companies of the United States
Space companies in the Dallas–Fort Worth metroplex
Companies based in the Dallas–Fort Worth metroplex
American companies established in 2014
Manufacturing companies established in 2014
Technology companies established in 2014
Private spaceflight companies
Rocket engine manufacturers of the United States
Manufacturing companies based in Texas
Privately held companies based in Texas
Space access
2014 establishments in Texas